Anderson-Lenda Lucoqui (born 6 July 1997) is a professional footballer who plays as a defender for Mainz 05. Born in Germany, he represents the Angola national team.

In May 2021, he declined an extension offer for his contract with Arminia Bielefeld and signed a deal with 1. FSV Mainz 05.

International career
Lucoqui was born in Zweibrücken, Germany and is of Angolan descent. He was raised in Leverkusen and has been a youth international for Germany.

On 22 September 2020, Lucoqui was called-up by the senior Angola national football team. He made his debut on 13 October 2020 as a 78th minute substitution during a friendly match against Mozambique.

Career statistics

References

External links
 

1997 births
Living people
People from Zweibrücken
German sportspeople of African descent
Angolan footballers
Angola international footballers
German footballers
Germany youth international footballers
German people of Angolan descent
Association football defenders
Fortuna Düsseldorf II players
Fortuna Düsseldorf players
Arminia Bielefeld players
1. FSV Mainz 05 players
Bundesliga players
2. Bundesliga players
Regionalliga players
Footballers from North Rhine-Westphalia